Vitaliy Guimaraes (born May 18, 2000) is an American artistic gymnast.  He was a member of the silver medal-winning team at the 2021 Pan American Championships.  He is a member of the USA national team and is currently competing in collegiate gymnastics for Oklahoma.

Personal life 
Guimaraes was born in Dallas, Texas on May 18, 2000.  He was raised in Arvada, Colorado.

Gymnastics career

2016–18 
Guimaraes competed at the RD761 International Junior Team Cup; his team finished fourth.  He competed at his first elite-level national championships where he finished sixth in the all-around in the 15-16 age division.  Guimaraes was selected to compete at the 2016 Junior Pan American Championships where he helped the United States finish first as a team.  Individually he placed first on floor exercise, second on horizontal bar, and third on vault.

In 2017 Guimaraes competed at the U.S. National Championships in the 17–18 age division.  He finished second in the all-around behind Brody Malone.  Additionally he posted top-3 finishes on all apparatuses except the parallel bars where he finished seventh.

At the 2018 U.S. National Championships Guimaraes once again competed in the 17-18 age division.  He placed fourth in the all-around but first on floor exercise and vault.

2019 
Guimaraes competed at the 2019 Winter Cup where he placed 22nd in the all-around.  He also started competing in collegiate gymnastics for the Oklahoma Sooners.  At his first NCAA Championships he helped Oklahoma finish second as a team behind Stanford.

2020–21 
In 2020 the NCAA season was cut short due to the ongoing COVID-19 pandemic.

Guimaraes returned to competition at the 2021 Winter Cup where he finished ninth in the all-around.  He next competed at the 2021 NCAA Championships where he helped Oklahoma once again finish second behind Stanford.  Individually he placed fourth in the all-around and on horizontal bar.

Guimaraes was selected to compete at the 2021 Pan American Championships; he helped the team win the silver medal behind Brazil.  Due to competing at the Pan American Championships, Guimaraes was invited to compete at the upcoming Olympic Trials. Guimaraes finished eleventh in the all-around at the Olympic Trials and was not added to the team.

2022 
Guimaraes competed at the 2022 Winter Cup where he won the competition.  This was the first competition that utilized bonus points based on difficulty scores.  Despite not gaining any of these bonuses, Guimaraes managed to post the highest score due to clean execution.

At the NCAA Championship Guimaraes helped Oklahoma finish second as a team.  Additionally he placed third on floor exercise.

Competitive history

References

External links
 
 

2000 births
Living people
People from Arvada, Colorado
American male artistic gymnasts
Oklahoma Sooners men's gymnasts
21st-century American people